Kyle Mills (born 1966) is an American writer of thriller novels including  Rising Phoenix, Fade, and The Second Horseman.  Several of his books (Rising Phoenix, Storming Heaven, Sphere of Influence, Free Fall and Darkness Falls) include a character Mark Beamon, an FBI special agent. He also wrote The Ares Decision (2011), The Utopia Experiment (2013), and The Patriot Attack (2015), the eighth, tenth, and twelfth installments of the Covert-One series, originally created by Robert Ludlum. He is the current writer of the Mitch Rapp series of novels after original author Vince Flynn died in 2013.

Mills lives in Jackson Hole, Wyoming with his wife and they are both avid rock climbers.  Mills grew up in Oregon, and his father was an agent with the FBI.

Novels by Kyle Mills

Stand-Alone books:

Burn Factor (2001, HarperCollins)
Smoke Screen (2003, Putnam)
Fade (2005, St. Martin's Press)
The Second Horseman (2006, St. Martin's Press)
Lords of Corruption (2009, Vanguard Press)
The Immortalists (2011, Thomas & Mercer)

Mark Beamon series:

Rising Phoenix (1997, HarperCollins)
Storming Heaven (1998, HarperCollins)
Free Fall (2000, HarperCollins)
Sphere of Influence (2002, Putnam)
Darkness Falls (2007, Vanguard Press)

Robert Ludlum's Covert-One series:

The Ares Decision (2011, Grand Central Publishing)
The Utopia Experiment (2013, Grand Central Publishing)
The Patriot Attack (2015, Grand Central Publishing)

Vince Flynn's Mitch Rapp series:

The Survivor (2015, Atria/Emily Bestler)
Order to Kill (2016, Atria/Emily Bestler)
Enemy of the State (2017, Atria/Emily Bestler Books)
Red War (2018, Atria/Emily Bestler Books)
Lethal Agent (2019, Atria/Emily Bestler Books)
Total Power (2020, Atria/Emily Bestler Books)
Enemy at the Gates (2021, Atria/Emily Bestler Books)
Oath of Loyalty (2022, Atria/Emily Bestler Books)

References

External links
 Author's page:  www.kylemills.com
 Enemy of the State: Book Review

1966 births
20th-century American novelists
21st-century American novelists
American male novelists
American thriller writers
Writers from Wyoming
Novelists from Oregon
Living people
20th-century American male writers
21st-century American male writers